Baretender's Blues is an album by American country music artist George Jones released in 1978 on the Epic Records label. It was re-released on CD on the Razor & Tie label in 1996.

Recording and composition
Like his previous album I Wanta Sing, 1978's Bartender's Blues has many up-tempo, rollicking songs that seemed to contradict the darkness and turmoil in Jones's personal life, which consisted of no shows, cocaine, and bankruptcy.  Of Jones's previous four LPs on Epic, only one had cracked the Top Ten (1976's Alone Again) and he had not had a number one single since "The Door" in 1974.  However, the singer was beginning to gain the attention from quarters that rarely paid much attention to country music, such as Penthouse, which called him "the spirit of country music, plain and simple, its true Holy Ghost", and The New York Times, which hailed the Texan "the finest, most riveting singer in country music."  The song "Bartender's Blues" helped to further his reputation with these critics, primarily because it was written by pop star James Taylor, who also sang harmony on the track.  The song, which contains the wistful ruminations of a bartender down on his luck, rose to number 6.  In the liner notes to the Jones compilation Anniversary – 10 Years of Hits, producer Billy Sherrill states that he was unhappy with the performance on the song, feeling that Jones over-sang it, an example of "George Jones trying to sound like George Jones" (Jones agreed with this assessment in a 2006 Billboard interview).  Another single, the gentle love song  "I'll Just Take It Out in Love", peaked at number 11.  Jones co-wrote two songs on the album, the tongue-in-cheek "If You Loved A Liar (You'd Hug My Neck)" and "I Don't Want No Stranger Sleeping in My Bed".

Sherrill employed his most contemporary production yet on Bartender's Blues, actually verging on soft rock in some places.  The LP includes some of the most blatantly lascivious material that Jones had ever recorded, such as the suggestive "Leaving Love All Over The Place" and the sensual "Ain't Your Memory Got No Pride at All."  Jones's contemporary and friend Merle Haggard had also recorded the latter on his 1977 album Ramblin' Fever.

Reception
While praising Jones's singing, Stephen Thomas Erlewine of AllMusic laments the dated production ("soft rock with its electric pianos") but cites the main flaw as "its uneven material.  Apart from the excellent weeper 'I'll Just Take It Out in Love,' the strongest song is the title track, which is James Taylor's impression of what life in a honky tonk must be. Despite the occasional weak song, Jones gives it his all throughout the record, which by and large keeps the album entertaining."  Writing about the title track in The New Yorker, Ian Crouch asserted, "His rendering of the chorus, with its 'four walls around me to hold my life,' may be the best expression of his incredible vocal gifts—despair and joy fighting out their eternal battle."

Track listing 
 "Bartender's Blues" (James Taylor) – 3:47
 "I'll Just Take It Out in Love" (Bob McDill) – 3:12
 "If You Loved a Liar (You'd Hug My Neck)" (Earl Montgomery, George Jones) – 2:24
 "Ain't Your Memory Got No Pride at All" (Red Lane, Boyce Porter, Bucky Jones) – 2:37
 "I Gave It All Up for You" (Earl Montgomery, Terry Skinner) – 2:21
 "I Don't Want No Stranger Sleepin' in My Bed" (George Jones, "Wild" Bill Emerson) – 2:58
 "I Ain't Got No Business Doin' Business Today" (Danny Morrison, Johnny Slate) – 2:54
 "Leaving Love All Over the Place" (Lathan Hudson) – 2:53
 "(When Your Phone Don't Ring) It'll Be Me" (Hank Cochran, Glenn Martin) – 2:27
 "Julianne" (Roger Bowling, "Wild" Bill Emerson) – 2:39

Personnel
George Jones – vocals, guitar
Billy Sanford – guitar
Reggie Young – guitar
Phil Baugh – guitar
Pete Drake – pedal steel guitar
Henry Strzelecki – bass
Jimmy Isbell – drums
Hargus "Pig" Robbins – piano
James Taylor – vocals on "Bartender's Blues"
Technical
Lou Bradley, Ron Reynolds – engineer
Virginia Team – design
Clark Thomas – photography

1978 albums
George Jones albums
Albums produced by Billy Sherrill
Epic Records albums